Arrhenechthites is a genus of flowering plants in the daisy family.

 Species
There is some disagreement over whether the genus name is masculine or feminine. Hence many of the species have two names that can be found in various publications. To help the reader find appropriate information, we provide links to both sets of names below.
 Arrhenechthites alba / Arrhenechthites albus  - New Guinea
 Arrhenechthites haplogyna / Arrhenechthites haplogynus  - New Guinea
 Arrhenechthites hydrangeoides  - Sulawesi
 Arrhenechthites mixta / Arrhenechthites mixtus  - New South Wales, Victoria
 Arrhenechthites novoguineensis  - New Guinea
 Arrhenechthites tomentella / Arrhenechthites tomentellus - New Guinea

References

Asteraceae genera
Senecioneae